Everything's Archie is the second studio album released by The Archies, a fictional pop band from the Archie universe. The single "Sugar, Sugar" went to number one on the pop chart selling over six million copies and was awarded a golden disc. The single was ranked as the number one song of the year for 1969 according to Billboard. The album was later reissued on RCA Records, and in 2012 by Essential Media Group. Everything's Archie peaked at number 66 on the Billboard 200 albums chart.

Background
It was originally released in 1969 on the Calendar Records label and included 12 songs. The album was produced by Jeff Barry. The male vocals for the Archies group were performed by lead singer Ron Dante and the female vocals were performed by Toni Wine.

Track listing

Charts

References

1969 albums
The Archies albums
RCA Records albums
Albums produced by Jeff Barry